William Steene (August 18, 1887 - March 24, 1965) was an American portrait painter and muralist.

Life
Steene was born on August 18, 1887, in Syracuse, New York. He graduated from the Art Students League of New York and the National Academy of Design.

Steene was an oil painter. He specialized in portraits and murals. He did over 400 portraits. He had a studio in Gulf Hills, Mississippi from 1950 to 1965.

Steene married Eula Mae Jackson Steene, and they had two daughters. He died on March 24, 1965, in Biloxi, Mississippi, at age 77.

References

1887 births
1965 deaths
People from Syracuse, New York
People from Jackson County, Mississippi
Art Students League of New York alumni
National Academy of Design alumni
American male painters
American muralists
American portrait painters
Painters from Mississippi
20th-century American painters
20th-century American male artists